Justin Byles (born 22 January 2005) is a Caymanian footballer.

Career statistics

International

References

2005 births
Living people
Association football midfielders
Caymanian footballers
Cayman Islands youth international footballers
Cayman Islands international footballers
Caymanian expatriate sportspeople in England
Expatriate footballers in England